Deborah Davis may refer to:

Deborah Davis (screenwriter), British screenwriter, author of The Favourite and Marie Antoinette
Deborah Dean Davis, American screenwriter for It Takes Two and The Incredible Hulk
Deborah Davis, author of Katharine the Great: Katharine Graham and her Washington Post Empire
Debbie Davis (model), American model
Debbie McCune Davis (born 1951), Democratic politician
Deborah Davis (hazzan), American cantor in Humanistic Judaism
Deborah Ludwig Davis, actress in Hollywood Beat
Deborah Davis, Miss West Virginia, 1979
Deborah Davis, executive producer of Borderland
Deborah Kay Davis, wife of Michael W. Smith

See also
Debra Davis, American politician
Deborah Kay Davies, Welsh author
Debbie Davies, guitarist